Mario Baccini (born 14 December 1957 in Rome) is an Italian politician, former member of the Union of Christian and Centre Democrats and promoter of the White Rose.

Biography 
He started his political activity as town councilor in Rome, for the Christian Democracy party (DC). In 1994, when DC disbanded, he joined the Christian Democratic Centre, which entered the Pole of Freedoms.

In the same year, he became president of the Christian Democratic Centre (CCD) parliamentary group at the Chamber of Deputies. Then he was secretary and national co-ordinator of the Christian Democratic Centre. In 2001 he was re-elected at the Parliament; in 2002 he joined the Union of Christian and Centre Democrats, the result of a merger between CCD, United Christian Democrats, and European Democracy.

In the Berlusconi II Cabinet he was sub-secretary of the Foreign Ministry from 2001 to 2004. On 3 December 2004, he became Minister of the Public Function. He was reconfirmed minister in Berlusconi III Cabinet from 2005 to 2006.

From 2006 to 2008 he was vice-president of the Senate.

On 30 January 2008, he left UDC and he founded the White Rose movement with Bruno Tabacci. He was candidated as mayor of Roma, taking just 0.8% of the votes. At Italian general election, the White Rose was in alliance with UDC and other Christian democrats movements into the Union of the Centre, and Baccini was elected to the Chamber of Deputies: he didn't join White Rose's parliamentary group, but rather he adhered to the mixed group.

On 14 May, during the parliament discussion about the motion of confidence to Berlusconi IV Cabinet, he announced to vote the confidence to the cabinet, leaving the project of the White Rose.

See also
White Rose

References

External links
Official website

1957 births
Living people
Politicians from Rome
Christian Democracy (Italy) politicians
Christian Democratic Centre politicians
Union of the Centre (2002) politicians
The Rose for Italy politicians
The People of Freedom politicians
New Centre-Right politicians
Deputies of Legislature XII of Italy
Deputies of Legislature XIII of Italy
Deputies of Legislature XIV of Italy
Senators of Legislature XV of Italy
Deputies of Legislature XVI of Italy
Libera Università Maria SS. Assunta alumni